Fells is a surname. Notable people with the surname include:

 Daniel Fells (born 1983), American football player
 Darren Fells (born 1986), American football player
 Ian Fells (21st century), English professor
 John Manger Fells (1858–1925), British accountant, consultant, and author

See also
 Felle